Manik  Singh  (born  village Sakaria, Sidhi district) is an Indian politician, belonging to Indian National Congress. In the 2007 by-elections he was elected to the 14th Lok Sabha from the Sidhi Lok Sabha constituency of Madhya Pradesh.

By-elections were held due to expulsion of sitting MP Chandrapratap Singh of Bhartiya Janata Party due to sting Operation Duryodhan by media firm Cobrapost and Hindi news TV channel Aaj Tak. He resides at Sidhi district .

References

External links
 Lok Sabha Members Bioprofile in Lok Sabha website

India MPs 2004–2009
Living people
People from Madhya Pradesh
People from Sidhi district
Lok Sabha members from Madhya Pradesh
Year of birth missing (living people)
Indian National Congress politicians from Madhya Pradesh